Qmatiye is a village in Aley District in the Mount Lebanon Governorate of Lebanon. It lies right beneath the town of Souk El Gharb. It has a small population and is a good tourist attraction in the summer.

History
In 1838, Eli Smith noted  the place, called el-Kummatiyeh, located in  El-Ghurb el-Fokany, upper el-Ghurb.

Main families in the village are:
 - Nassreddine
 - Hamade
 - Jaafar
 - Awada
 - Zarwi
 - Doughaily
 - Salloukh

References

Bibliography

External links
 Qamatiyeh, Localiban 

Populated places in Aley District